was a town located in Kitauwa District, Ehime Prefecture, Japan.

As of 2000, the town had an estimated population of 11,147 and a density of 72.87 persons per km². The total area was 152.98 km².

On January 1, 2005, Hiromi, along with the village of Hiyoshi (also from Kitauwa District), was merged to create the new town of Kihoku.

External links
Official website of Kihoku 

Dissolved municipalities of Ehime Prefecture